Indian Caverns was a show cave in Spruce Creek, Pennsylvania, United States from 1929-2017. It is a horizontal karst cave of Ordovician Nealmont/Benner limestone, estimated to be about 500,000 years old. It is the second-largest cave in Pennsylvania and the largest limestone cave. Indian Caverns consists of two sections, originally separated by a 14-foot wall: the "Historic Cave" and the "Giant's Hall". The "historic" part of the cave is generally low-ceilinged and closer to the surface (as shallow as 15 ft) with a couple of wide rooms and extensive speleothem formation. The Giant's Hall area consists of several large passageways, up to 60 feet high, but with fewer speleothems - though it does include the largest sheet of flowstone in the northeast and a substantial rimstone pool. The lowest point of the cave is approximately 140 feet beneath the surface and the cave temperature is a constant 56 degrees Fahrenheit (13 degrees Celsius).

Background

Artifacts found in the cave indicate that it was inhabited as long ago as 8000 BC. The earliest tribe known to have used the cave were the Susquehannocks, circa 1600 AD. It was later used by  Algonkian (including Lenni Lenape) and Iroquois (probably Mohawk) tribes through the early eighteenth century. Examples of the artifacts are on display in the cave and include arrow and spearheads, tobacco pipes, tomahawks, punches, banner stones, a bone flute, and pottery shards. They also include a rare effigy of the Algonkian guardian spirit, Mesingw.

One room, the "Grotto of the Wah-Wah-Taysee", features a phosphorescent mineral deposit in the ceiling and walls. It was originally thought to be radium, but has since been identified as zinc sulfide reacting with calcite in the limestone. The cave also contains a "musical rock", which resounds with a bell-like tone when struck.

Indian Caverns was known about by European settlers from the late eighteenth century. From about 1816, it was one of several caves used as a hideout by the outlaw David Lewis until his death in 1820. The entrance and grounds were bought in 1928 by Harold Wertz, Sr., a local entrepreneur, and the cave was opened to the public on June 14, 1929.  Wertz opened the cave after two years of excavation and about half a million dollars worth of investments.  Wertz, along with his family, moved to Florida during the great depression, but returned each summer to run and upkeep the caves. Before the Indian relics were found inside the first few chambers in the caverns, the cave was planned to be called "Franklin Cave", but it seemed more appropriate to be called "Historic Indian Cave". Then in the late 1930s - early 1940s the name was changed to "Indian Caverns". It was a popular destination during the Early Auto Era due to the Edwardian fascination with the "wonders" of nature and remained in continuous operation until 2017. In 2017, the Western Pennsylvania Convervancy purchased the property and is currently in the works of naturalizing the cave (returning it to its original state). The Conservancy plans to use the caverns as a bat sanctuary in the coming years and conduct research on the local bat species.

External links
Show Caves of the United States website

Caves of Pennsylvania
Show caves in the United States
Limestone caves
Landforms of Huntingdon County, Pennsylvania
Tourist attractions in Huntingdon County, Pennsylvania